This is a list of the  number-one singles of 1962.

1962 record charts
Lists of number-one songs in Europe